Pirez may refer to:

 João Pirez, Portuguese nobleman
 Jhon Pírez (born 1993), Uruguayan footballer
 Leandro González Pírez (born 1992), Argentine footballer

See also
 Piréz people, a fictional nation invented by Tárki, a Hungarian polling company, to measure attitudes regarding immigration

See also